The Epynt Way is a long-distance path created by the Ministry of Defence in 2004 around the perimeter of its 'Sennybridge Training Area (SENTA)' and artillery range on Mynydd Epynt in Powys, Wales. There is, understandably, virtually no public access across the land used by the MoD, pre-existing public rights of way and public roads having been closed, with only one or two exceptions. The establishment of the Epynt Way, section by section in recent years has gone some way to compensating for that reduction in public access across the area.

Route

The circular route which is described as a permissive bridleway is 75 km / 49 mi in total length and available to walkers, cyclists and horseriders. It travels around the edge of the plateau, and keeps clear of MOD firing ranges. Nearest towns are Brecon to the south and Llandovery to the west, with Llangammarch Wells to the north. A leaflet and map can be downloaded from the Defence Estates website. It is covered by Ordnance Survey Explorer maps 187 'Llandovery' and 188 'Builth Wells'. Further information about the Epynt Way is displayed at The Epynt Centre, an interpretive centre beside the B4519 road north of Upper Chapel which was refurbished in 2009. Being in an upland area it contains steep and boggy sections that require extra care. Poor weather also demands extra awareness of route finding, especially in mist and fog as well as precipitation such as rain and snow. The route is waymarked throughout with 1.2 metre posts and finger posts at junctions with external paths, but local large-scale maps such as the OS Explorer map series should be used for information.

References

External links
MOD leaflet on short walks near Sennybridge
General guidance about access to MOD training areas
Detailed advice on access with maps of the route

Footpaths in Powys
Recreational walks in Wales
Long-distance footpaths in Wales
Epynt